Eugene Gilhawley (14 April 1910 – 3 May 1987) was an Irish Fine Gael politician, from Ballymote, County Sligo. Gilhawley represented the Ballymote area on Sligo County Council from 1955 to his retirement in 1979. He was elected to Dáil Éireann as a Fine Gael Teachta Dála (TD) for the Sligo–Leitrim constituency at the 1961 general election and was re-elected at the 1965 general election. He lost his seat at the 1969 general election but was again elected at the 1973 general election and was re-elected at the 1977 general election. He did not contest the 1981 general election.

Gilhawley had worked as a National School principal for many years, until retiring in 1973, and was also an active member of Sligo GAA.

References

1910 births
1987 deaths
Fine Gael TDs
Members of the 17th Dáil
Members of the 18th Dáil
Members of the 20th Dáil
Members of the 21st Dáil
Local councillors in County Sligo
Irish schoolteachers